Grimston is a civil parish about 8 miles from York, in the Selby district, in the county of North Yorkshire, England. In 2001 the parish had a population of 59. The parish touches Bolton Percy, Kirkby Wharfe with North Milford, Oxton, Stutton with Hazlewood, Tadcaster and Towton.

Features 
There are 14 listed buildings in Grimston.

History 
The name "Grimston" means 'Grimr's farm/settlement. Grimston was recorded in the Domesday Book of 1086 as Mitune. Grimston was formerly a township in the parish of Kirkby Wharf; in 1866 Grimston became a civil parish in its own right.

James VI and I came to Grimston Park, the house of Sir Edward Stanhope, on 19 April 1603. He knighted 11 men including Roger Aston and Charles Montagu.

References 

 

Civil parishes in North Yorkshire
Selby District